Pandit Bhagwat Dayal Sharma University of Health Sciences is a state university located at Rohtak, Haryana, India. It was established in 2008 by Pandit Bhagwat Dayal Sharma University of Health Sciences Rohtak Act, 2008 of the Government of Haryana, amended in 2008, 2009, 2010 and 2011. The university incorporates Pandit Bhagwat Dayal Sharma Post Graduate Institute of Medical Sciences (PGIMS), as well as Postgraduate Institute of Dental Sciences, and several other colleges, and affiliates medical colleges, dental colleges, physiotherapy colleges, Ayurvedic colleges, homoeopathic colleges and pharmacy colleges in Haryana.

References

External links

Medical and health sciences universities in India
Medical colleges in Haryana
Universities in Haryana
Education in Rohtak
Educational institutions established in 2008
2008 establishments in Haryana